The 1993 Men's European Volleyball Championship was the 18th edition of the event, organized by Europe's governing volleyball body, the Confédération Européenne de Volleyball. It was hosted in Oulu and Turku, Finland from September 4 to September 12, 1993.

Teams

Group A – Oulu
 
 *
 
 
 
 

Group B – Turku
 
 
 
 
 
 

*Note: Although the Czech Republic and Slovakia became separate countries in 1993, the Czechoslovakia Volleyball Federation (ČSFV) was not yet separate, therefore the team competed as Czechoslovakia (officially as Czech Republic + Slovak Republic).

Preliminary round

Final round

Final ranking

References
 Results

Men's European Volleyball Championships
E
Volleyball Championship
V
September 1993 sports events in Europe